Gary Clement (born July 1959) is a Canadian artist, illustrator and writer living in Toronto, Ontario.

Clement is the daily political cartoonist for Canada's National Post in Toronto since the newspaper's launch in 1998. His illustration work has appeared in magazines and newspapers including Mother Jones, The Wall Street Journal, The New York Times, Time, The Guardian, and The National (Abu Dhabi). His work has been selected for American Illustration on numerous occasions. 

His second children's picture book, The Great Poochini, received the Governor General's Award for Children's Literature Illustration in 1999. In 2007 one of his cartoons was a Top 10 selection by Time and his work has frequently appeared in The Sunday New York Times Week in Review section.

He was nominated for the Governor General's Award for the books "Just Stay Put", which he also wrote, and "Oy Feh So?" written by Cary Fagan.

He has illustrated children's books by a number of other writers.

Clement also paints and draws. His art is represented in Toronto by Dianna Witte Gallery. https://diannawitte.com/artists.php

Selected works
As writer and illustrator

 Just Stay Put: A Chelm Story (Folk & Fairytales), (Groundwood Books, 1996) – finalist, Governor General's Award for Illustration
 The Great Poochini, (Groundwood, 1999) – winner, Governor General's Award for Children's Book Illustration
  "Swimming, Swimming" (Groundwood, 2015)

As illustrator only

 Get Growing!: How the Earth Feeds Us, (Groundwood, 1991), by Candace Savage
 Stories from Adam and Eve to Ezekiel: Retold from the Bible, (Groundwood, 2004), by Celia Barker Lottridge
 One-Eye! Two-Eyes! Three-Eyes!: A Very Grimm Fairy Tale, (Simon & Schuster, 2006), by Aaron Shepard
 Ten Old Men and a Mouse, (Tundra Books, 2007), by Cary Fagan
 A Coyote Solstice Tale, (Groundwood, 2009), by Thomas King
 "Oy Feh So?", (Groundwood, 2013) by Cary Fagan
 "The Hockey Song", (Greystone Books), by Stompin' Tom Connors
 "My Winter City"' (Groundwood, 2019) by James Gladstone

References

External links
 
 

1959 births
Canadian children's book illustrators
Canadian cartoonists
Governor General's Award-winning children's illustrators
Artists from Toronto
Living people
Date of birth missing (living people)